The Mamirauá Sustainable Development Reserve in the Brazilian state of Amazonas, near the city of Tefé, is a  reserve near the village of Boca do Mamirauá. It includes mostly Amazonian flooded forest and wetlands. The 
ribeirinhos are native to the area.

Location
The Mamirauá Sustainable Development Reserve is divided between the municipalities of Uarini	 (18.68%), Tonantins (1.24%), Maraã (26.74%), Japurá (1.33%) and Fonte Boa (52.01%) in the state of Amazonas.
It covers the elongated triangle between the Solimões River (Upper Amazon) to the south, the Auati-Paraná Canal, which leaves the Solimões and meanders in a generally eastward direction to join the Japurá River to the north, and the Japurá from the junction with the Auati-Paraná to the point where it joins the Solimões.
It adjoins the Auatí-Paraná Extractive Reserve to the north.
The Amanã Sustainable Development Reserve lies on the opposite bank of the Japurá to the east.

Protection

Mamirauá is recognised by the international Ramsar Convention, as a wetland of global importance, as well as part of a World Heritage Convention's natural site. At present, it is included in one of the ecological corridors to be implemented by the PPG-7 Program for the Protection of Brazilian Tropical Forests.

Jaú National Park was inscribed by UNESCO as a  World Heritage Site  in 2000.
It became part of the Central Amazon Ecological Corridor, established in 2002.
In 2003 the property was expanded by the addition of the Anavilhanas National Park, Amanã Sustainable Development Reserve and Mamirauá Sustainable Development Reserve to form the Central Amazon Conservation Complex, a larger World Heritage Site.

The reserve is the legacy and life work of Brazilian scientist José Márcio Ayres.

Mamirauá has a human population estimated in 6,306 individuals, including amazonian caboclo, Ticuna, Cambeba and Cocama Amerindian groups.

Marirauá also protects against the illegal hunting of caiman crocodiles, an endangered species due to human hunting for the sale of their skins.

Wildlife

The reserve is in the Solimões-Japurá moist forests and Purus várzea eco regions.
There are two endemic primates, the white uakari (Cacajao calvus calvus) and black-head squirrel monkey (Saimiri vanzolinii). The reserve is also home of other kinds primates, such as the Juruá red howler monkey, the Peruvian spider monkey, pygmy marmosets and saki monkeys. The reserve also harbours other arboreal mammals species such as the brown-throated sloth, the South American coati, the northern Amazon red squirrel and the collared anteater. Land mammals are not that common as most of the territory is flooded during the wet season, although jaguars may reside and remain in the forest even during flooding. Mamirauá hosts a large diversity of birds, with more than 400 species recorded, including toucans, harpy eagle, hoatzin, parrots and, specially, aquatic birds. The most conspicuous fish species are tambaqui, piranha and pirarucu. Mamirauá is also a perfect place to spot the Amazon river dolphins, both boto and tucuxi.

See also
 Ecotourism in the Amazon rainforest

References

Sources

Further reading

1996 establishments in Brazil
Sustainable development reserves of Brazil
Protected areas of Amazonas (Brazilian state)
Ramsar sites in Brazil
Wetlands of Brazil
Populated places in Amazonas (Brazilian state)